A megastructure is a very large artificial object, although the limits of precisely how large vary considerably. Some apply the term to any especially large or tall building. Some sources define a megastructure as an enormous self-supporting artificial construct. The products of megascale engineering or astroengineering are megastructures. The lower bound of megastructural engineering might be considered any structure that has any single dimension 1 megameter (1000 km) in length.

Most megastructure designs could not be constructed with today's level of industrial technology. This makes their design examples of speculative (or exploratory) engineering. Those that could be constructed easily qualify as megaprojects.

Megastructures are also an architectural concept popularized in the 1960s where a city could be encased in a single building, or a relatively small number of buildings interconnected. Such arcology concepts are popular in science fiction. Megastructures often play a part in the plot or setting of science fiction movies and books, such as Rendezvous with Rama by Arthur C. Clarke.

In 1968, Ralph Wilcoxen defined a megastructure as any structural framework into which rooms, houses, or other small buildings can later be installed, uninstalled, and replaced; and which is capable of "unlimited" extension. This type of framework allows the structure to adapt to the individual wishes of its residents, even as those wishes change with time.

Other sources define a megastructure as "any development in which residential densities are able to support services and facilities essential for the development to become a self-contained community".

Many architects have designed such megastructures. Some of the more notable such architects and architectural groups include the Metabolist Movement, Archigram, Cedric Price, Frei Otto, Constant Nieuwenhuys, Yona Friedman, and Buckminster Fuller.

Existing
There are structures that may be considered megastructures, such as
 The Rice Terraces of the Philippine Cordilleras, a  sprawling agricultural landscape carved in the mountains by free tribesmen of Ifugao some 6,000 to 2,000 years ago.
 Skyscrapers represent the current state-of-the-art in large structure engineering. (See the List of tallest buildings and structures in the world and list of largest buildings in the world.)
 The Large Hadron Collider consists of, among other structures, a ring 27 kilometers in circumference.

Networks of roads or railways, and collections of buildings (cities and associated suburbs), are usually not considered megastructures, despite frequently qualifying based on size. However, an ecumenopolis might qualify.

Proposed
 Atlantropa, a hydroelectric dam to be built across the Strait of Gibraltar, lowering the surface of the Mediterranean Sea by as much as 200 meters.
 Trans-Global Highway, highway systems that would link all six of the inhabited continents on Earth. The highway would network new and existing bridges and tunnels, not only improving ground transportation but also potentially offering a conduit for utility pipelines.
 Cloud nine is Buckminster Fuller's proposal for a tensegrity sphere a mile in radius which would be large enough so that it would float in the sky if heated by only one degree above ambient temperature, creating habitats for mini cities of thousands of people in each "Cloud Nine". Fuller also proposed a marine analog consisting of a hollow terraced floating tetrahedron of reinforced concrete measuring one mile from vertex to vertex supporting a population of one million living in air-deployed residential modules on the exterior with the requisite infrastructure providing utilities (water, power, sewerage, etc.) inside. The modules would have standardized utility ports so as to be completely livable within minutes of arrival, and could be subsequently detached and moved to other such cities.

Theoretical
A number of theoretical structures have been proposed which may be considered megastructures.

Stellar scale

Most stellar scale megastructure proposals are designs to make use of the energy from a sun-like star while possibly still providing gravity or other attributes that would make it attractive for an advanced civilization.
 The Alderson disk is a theoretical structure in the shape of a disk, whose outer radius is equivalent to the orbit of Mars or Jupiter and whose thickness is several thousand miles. A civilization could live on either side, held by the gravity of the disk and still receive sunlight from a star bobbing up and down in the middle of the disk.
 A Dyson sphere (also known as a Dyson shell) refers to a structure or mass of orbiting objects that completely surrounds a star to make full use of its solar energy.
 A Matrioshka brain is a collection of multiple Concentric Dyson Spheres which make use of star's energy for computing.
 A Stellar engine either uses the temperature difference between a star and interstellar space to extract energy or serves as a Shkadov thruster.
 A Shkadov thruster accelerates an entire star through space by selectively reflecting or absorbing light on one side of it.
 Topopolis (also known as Cosmic Spaghetti) is a large tube that rotates to provide artificial gravity.
 A Ringworld (or Niven Ring) is an artificial ring encircling a star, rotating faster than orbital velocity to create artificial gravity on its inner surface. A non-rotating variant is a transparent ring of breathable gas, creating a continuous microgravity environment around the star, as in the eponymous Smoke Ring.

Related structures which might not be classified as individual stellar megastructures, but occur on a similar scale:

 A Dyson swarm is a Dyson sphere made up of separately orbiting elements (including large habitats) rather than a single continuous shell.
 A Dyson bubble is a Dyson sphere in which the individual elements are statites, non-orbital objects held aloft by the pressure of sunlight.

Planetary scale
 A Bishop Ring, Halo or Orbital is a space habitat similar to but much smaller than a Niven Ring. Instead of being centered on a star, it is in orbit around the star and its diameter is typically on the order of magnitude of a planet. By tilting the ring relative to its orbit, the inner surface would experience a nearly conventional day and night cycle. Due to its enormous scale, the habitat would not need to be fully enclosed like the Stanford torus, instead its atmosphere would be retained solely by centripetal gravity and side walls, allowing an open sky.
 Globus Cassus is a hypothetical proposed project for the transformation of Planet Earth into a much bigger, hollow, artificial world with the ecosphere on its inner surface. This model serves as a tool to understand the World's real functioning processes.
 Shellworlds or paraterraforming are inflated shells holding high pressure air around an otherwise airless world to create a breathable atmosphere. The pressure of the contained air supports the weight of the shell.
 Completely hollow shell worlds can also be created on a planetary or larger scale by contained gas alone, also called gravitational balloons, as long as the outward pressure from the contained gas balances the gravitational contraction of the entire structure, resulting in no net force on the shell. The scale is limited only by the mass of gas enclosed, the shell can be made of any mundane material. The shell can have an additional atmosphere on the outside.
It can also refer to terraformed or artificial planets with multiple concentric layers.

Orbital structures
 An orbital ring is a dynamically elevated ring placed around the Earth that rotates at an angular rate that is faster than orbital velocity at that altitude, stationary platforms can be supported by the excess centripetal acceleration of the super-orbiting ring (similar in principle to a Launch loop), and ground-tethers can be supported from stationary platforms.
 The Bernal sphere is a proposal for a spherical space colony with a maximum diameter of 16 kilometers. It would have gravity at the equator, and gradually turn to zero G at the poles.
 Rotating wheel space stations, such as the Stanford torus, are wheel-like space station which produce artificial gravity by rotation. Typical designs include transport spokes to a central hub used for docking and/or micro-gravity research.
 The related concepts, O'Neill and McKendree cylinders, are both pairs of counter-rotating cylinders containing habitable areas inside and creating 1g on their inner surfaces via centripetal acceleration. The scale of each concept came from estimating the largest 1g cylinder that could be built from steel (O'Neill) or carbon fiber (McKendree).
 Hollowed asteroids (or Bubble worlds or Terraria) are spun on their axis for simulated gravity and filled with air, allowing them to be inhabited on the inside. In some concepts, the asteroid is heated to molten rock and inflated into its final form.
 A stellaser is a star-powered laser or maser.

Trans-orbital structures

 A skyhook is a very long tether that hangs down from orbit.
 A space elevator is a tether that is fixed to the ground, extending beyond geostationary orbital altitude, such that centripetal force exceeds gravitational force, leaving the structure under slight outward tension.
 A space fountain is a dynamically supported structure held up by the momentum of masses which are shot up to the top at high speeds from the ground.
 A launch loop (or Lofstrom loop) is a dynamically supported 2000 km long iron loop that projects up in an arc to 80 km that is ridden by maglev cars while achieving orbital velocity.
 StarTram Generation 2 is a maglev launch track extending from the ground to above 96% of the atmosphere's mass, supported by magnetic levitation.
 A rotovator is a rotating tether where the lower tip is moving in the opposite direction to the tether's orbital velocity, reducing the difference in velocity relative to the ground, and hence reducing the velocity of rendezvous; the upper tip is likewise moving at greater than orbital velocity, allowing propellantless transfer between orbits. Around an airless world, such as the moon, the lower tip can actually touch the ground with zero horizontal velocity. As with any momentum exchange tether, orbital energy is gained or lost in the transfer.

Fictional
A number of structures have appeared in fiction which may be considered megastructures.

Stellar scale
 The Dyson sphere has appeared in many works of fiction, including the Star Trek universe.
 Larry Niven's series of novels beginning with Ringworld centered on, and originated the concept of a ringworld, or Niven ring. A ringworld is an artificial ring with a radius roughly equal to the radius of the Earth's orbit (1 AU). A star is present in the center and the ring spins to create g-forces, with inner walls to hold in the atmosphere. The structure is unstable, and required the author to include workarounds in subsequent novels set on it.
 In the manga Blame! the megastructure is a vast and chaotic complex of metal, concrete, stone, etc., that covers the Earth and assimilates the Moon, and eventually expands to encompass a volume greater than the orbit of Jupiter.
 In White Light by William Barton and Michael Capobianco, a Topopolis is presented as taking over the entire universe.
In the Heechee Saga series by Frederik Pohl, a race of pure energy beings called The Foe have constructed the Kugelblitz, a black hole made of energy and not matter.
 In the Xeelee series of books by Stephen Baxter, the eponymous alien race constructed the Ring, a megastructure made of cosmic strings, spanning over 10 million light years.
 In Freelancer, The Dom'Kavosh's Dyson shell that is inhabited by a drone race created by the Dom'Kavosh, Nomads. This is reached via a hyper gate, created by the same creators as the Dyson sphere.
 The Saga of Cuckoo series novel Wall Around a Star mentions a proposal to build a super dyson sphere, completely enclosing the Galactic Center.
 The title of the novel Helix by Eric Brown directly references a stellar-scale helical megastructure. Different types of environments and habitats are interspersed along the structure, while their varying distance from the central star affects the climate.
The player's central quest in computer game Dyson Sphere Program is to construct Dyson sphere. Gameplay focuses on constructing planetary scale factories as a means towards this end.
 The Quarg in the game Endless Sky are shown building a massive ring around one of their stars, which is most likely around one astronomical unit in diameter. A completed version of this can also be found in another location.
 In computer games Space Empires IV and Space Empires V, the player can construct sphereworlds and ringworlds around stars.
 Dennis E. Taylor's 2020 novel Heaven's River features a Topopolis built around an alien system. Different segments of the structure are built with artificial climate and weather.

Planetary and orbital scale

 Several structures from the fictional Halo universe:
 The original twelve Halos, seen in Halo: Cryptum, were 30,000 kilometers in diameter; a separate array of six Halos are 10,000 kilometers in diameter, with one of the original twelve later being reduced to this size in Halo: Primordium.
 The Lesser Ark is a 127,530 km diameter structure from which the Halo Array can be activated and capable of building 10,000 km Halos. The "greater" Ark, seen in Cryptum and Primordium, is capable of producing 30,000 km Halos. 
 Onyx is an artificial planet made entirely out of Forerunner Sentinels (advanced replicating robots). At its core is a "shield world", contained within slipstream space, that is approximately one astronomical unit in diameter. The much smaller Shield World 0459, (approximately 1,400 km in diameter), is the setting for the latter half of Halo Wars. A third shield world, Requiem, is the primary setting for Halo 4.  Requiem is an artificial hollow planet encased in a kind of Dyson Sphere. Halo 5: Guardians introduces a fourth shield world, Genesis.
 High Charity, the Covenant's mobile planetoid station.
In the Doctor Who episodes The Stolen Earth and Journey’s End, a planet-sized space station known as The Crucible is built by the Daleks, a genocidal alien race, and facilitates the reality bomb, a weapon meant to erase the entire multiverse from existence. The Crucible also held enough Daleks to slaughter the universe they were in even without the bomb, according to The Doctor.
 In Sonic Adventure 2 and Shadow The Hedgehog, the Eclipse Cannon is a planet-destroying WMD built inside of the Space Colony Ark. 
 Buster Machine III from Gunbuster.
 The Culture Orbital from The Culture.
 In the 2013 CGI anime film, Space Pirate Captain Harlock, the Jovian Accelerator is an ancient, Death Star-like Weapon of mass destruction that uses energy from Jupiter's atmosphere to create a large beam of intense light strong enough to destroy an entire planet.
 Sidonia, the main ship and home of millions of humans, 1000 years in the future in the Knights of Sidonia manga and anime series, created after the destruction of the earth along with other unnamed seed ships.
 Trantor, the capital of an interstellar empire in Isaac Asimov's Foundation series, is an ecumenopolis, a planet entirely covered in one huge metal-clad building, with only one small green space: the Emperor's palace grounds.
 The Ori Supergate seen in a number of episodes of Stargate SG1 could be classed as a megastructure.
 In The Hitchhiker's Guide to the Galaxy series, Earth, as well as other planets, were artificial megastructures. Earth was intended to function as a gigantic computer and was built by a race of beings who made their living by manufacturing other planets.
 Mata-Nui in the BIONICLE franchise is classifiable as a megastructure. In the story, he is a massive robot as tall as a planet, and inside his body, every inhabitant of the BIONICLE Universe (Matoran, Toa, etc.) all live, unaware that they live inside a massive, space-traveling entity.
 In the Robotech Sentinels novels, Haydon IV is an artificially constructed cyber-planet with android citizens.
 In the Invader Zim episode "Planet Jackers", two aliens surround the Earth with a fake sky in order to throw it into their sun.
 In the 2017 video game Destiny 2, the fleet of Dominus Ghaul, the ruler of the Cabal Empire, features a massive super-weapon named the Almighty, whose wingspan is said to be as wide as the planet Mercury. Almighty links itself to a solar system's star on the quantum level via an energy beam and breaks it down into usable fuel, warping to another system before the star collapses into a supernova. 
 Nightmare's fortress from Kirby: Right Back at Ya! can be classified as a megastructure because it is the size of a small planet.
 In several works, Arthur C. Clarke writes about a colossal hollow tube, first described in Rendezvous with Rama (1973), and inhabited by different races.
 The Citadel in the Mass Effect universe is an enormous space station constructed by an ancient race of machines called the Reapers millions of years before the games in the series. At the time of Mass Effect 2, its population is 13.2 million.
 In the game Airforce Delta Strike a large Space Elevator called the Chiron Lift is used to send supplies out into outer space.
 In the Warhammer 40,000 series, the Imperial Palace (site of the Golden Throne wherein the Emperor of Mankind is kept alive indefinitely) could be considered a megastructure. The palace is a complex of continent-wide structures with the Golden Throne being located in an area stretching across the whole of the Himalayan mountains.
 In the film Elysium, a luxury space station (a Bishop Ring) called Elysium houses the wealthy population of the human species.
 Large rotating space-stations are a staple of science fiction, including Arthur C. Clarke's novel 2001: A Space Odyssey, the battle school from Ender's Game, and the eponymous Babylon 5.
 Hollowed asteroids feature in various fiction, such as Kim Stanley Robinson's novel 2312, Larry Niven's Known Space, and Golden Age SF writers like Clarke and Asimov.
 In the 2022 film Moonfall, Earth's moon is knocked from its orbit and begins to circle closer to Earth. A conspiracy theorist believes the Moon is a Dyson sphere megastructure and turns out to be correct.

Star Wars (1977 – Present, American sci-fi franchise) 
 The Death Star from Star Wars is 100 km in diameter. 
 The Centerpoint Station was a 350  km spherical space station at the Lagrangian point between the planets Talus and Tralus in the Corellia system. It was a gigantic and ancient hyperspace tractor beam with which an ancient race, known as Celestials, created the Corellia star system. With the help of the tractor beam, whole planets could be moved through hyperspace and arranged into their actual orbits around the central star. On the other hand, the same technology could be used as a weapon to destroy even stars. On the inside of the main sphere, a huge living space called Hollowtown was home to many people in a similar fashion as on the inside of a Dyson sphere.
 Coruscant, an enormous city, entirely covers its host planet. It serves as the capital of first the Republic and then later the First Galactic Empire.
 The Galaxy Gun, a large space station designed to destroy entire planets from across the galaxy could be considered a megastructure because its size is more than seven kilometres long.
 The Star Forge from Star Wars: Knights of the Old Republic.
 Glavis Ringworld is a ring shaped space station around a star in The Book of Boba Fett.

Stellaris (2016 Video Game) 

 Stellar-Scale Megastructures
 A Dyson Sphere is a megastructure added in the Utopia expansion, capable of producing massive amounts of energy at the cost of rendering the solar system uninhabitable, except for Habitats.
 A Ring World is a megastructure added in the Utopia expansion, offering a solar-system sized habitat equivalent to four massive habitable planets.
 A Matter Decompressor is a megastructure added in the Megacorp expansion to the game and allows the owner to harvest massive amounts of minerals from the cores of Black Holes.
 A Mega-Shipyard is a massive shipyard in orbit of a star, capable of producing ships much faster than average shipyards.
 The Aetherophasic Engine is a megastructure built by crisis aspirants, capable of destroying the entire galaxy as a side-product of allowing the race which constructed it to ascend to the "Shroud", an alternate dimension in the game composed of nearly pure energy
 A Quantum Catapult is a large megastructure built around a pulsar or neutron star that is capable of sending fleets instantly across the galaxy. It however is not completely accurate and thus can send fleets away from their intended destinations.
 Orbital/Planetary Scale Megastructures
 A Science Nexus is a massive orbital science laboratory which expands the empire's science production massively.
 A Sentry Array is a massive orbital station that gives you sight over the entire in-game galaxy.
 Habitats are orbital structures which serve the purpose of a small planet.
 A Mega Art Installation is a megastructure that improves your overall amenities and happiness in your empire.
 A Strategic Coordination Center is a megastructure that Increases your naval capacity, and ship speed, as well as adds several other bonuses.
 An Interstellar Assembly acts as a hub for the game's Galactic Community, increases your diplomatic weight, adds more envoys, and another empire's opinion of you.
 Gateways allow for near-instantaneous travel across the galaxy. In addition, there is a unique form of Gateway called "L-Gates" which link up to an extragalactic cluster of stars.
 Orbital Rings are massive ring structures built around planets that afford extra protection and increase the output of the planet.
 Hyper Relays are large structures that allow ships to jump to identical Hyper Relays in adjacent systems instead of using the existing hyperlane connections, thereby avoiding having to traverse systems at sublight speeds.
 In addition, many megastructures can also generate in "ruined" versions, which the player can later repair.

See also

 Arcology
 Skyscraper

References

External links
 National Geographic Channel
 Megastructure.org Megastructure Art
 Stellaris Wiki Megastructures in Stellaris

 
Exploratory engineering
Science fiction themes